The siege of Trichinopoly (1751–1752) was conducted by Chanda Sahib, who had been recognized as the Nawab of the Carnatic by representatives of the French East India Company, against the fortress town of Trichinopoly, held by Muhammed Ali Khan Wallajah.

Background

Following the Battle of Ambur in 1749, in which Muhammed's father Anwaruddin Muhammed Khan was slain, Muhammed fled to Trichinopoly.  Chanda, assisted by Joseph François Dupleix, had planned to besiege Muhammed there in 1749, but the need for funding and provisions led him to instead besiege Tanjore first, and movements of Chanda's Maratha enemies prompted him to lift that siege and move north to face the new threat.  Muhammed had in the meantime opened separate negotiations with both the French and British for support.  In response to these, the British sent several hundred Europeans to Trichinopoly.

Siege
In March 1751 Chanda again began moving south from the Carnatic capital of Arcot, again with French support.  The size of his force prompted the British at Madras to send additional troops toward Trichinopoly to intercept Chanda.  After a brief encounter near Valikondapuram in July, the outnumbered British retreated to Trichinopoly.  Chanda followed with his main army, and began besieging the fortress town.  Siege operations were principally conducted by the French contingent, first under D'Auteuil, and the later under Law.

In an attempt to relieve the siege, the British in Madras sent Captain Robert Clive with a small force to occupy Arcot, which Chanda had left inadequately defended.  Chanda detached 4,000 of his siege force in an attempt to recover Arcot; this attempt famously failed, propelling Clive into a more prominent role in India.

The siege was eventually lifted, and the tables turned, in April 1752 with the arrival of British reinforcements led by Stringer Lawrence and including Clive.  On 9 April Lawrence made a junction with troops sent out of Trichinopoly and made it inside the lines.  Two days later he led a sortie against the besiegers, prompting Law to lift the siege and retreat to the isle of Srirangam.

Aftermath
The British then seized the opportunity to act against an indecisive opponent, and besieged and the French on the island.  Chanda eventually negotiated a surrender to Tanjorean forces that had arrived to assist the British, believing this to be preferable to surrendering to the British.  The Tanjoreans violated their promises to assist in his escape and beheaded him on 14 June.  Law surrendered the French troops on the same day.

See also 
 Fort St George
 Fort St David
 Tiruchirappalli Fort

References

Dodwell, Henry. Clive and Dupleix
Mehta, J. L. Advanced study in the history of modern India 1707-1813

Battles of the Second Carnatic War
French East India Company
Battles involving the French East India Company
Sieges involving the Indian kingdoms
Siege of Trichinopoly (1751-52)
Siege of Trichinopoly (1751-52)
Siege of Trichinopoly (1751-52)
1751 in India
1752 in India
Sieges involving the British East India Company
History of Tiruchirappalli